Richard Blount may refer to:
Richard Blount (priest) (1565–1638), English priest and Jesuit
Richard Blount (died 1556), Member of Parliament (MP) for Calais
Sir Richard Blount (died 1564), MP for Steyning
Richard Blount (died 1575), MP for Taunton
Richard Blount (MP for Chipping Wycombe) (died 1628), MP for Chipping Wycombe
Richard Blount (MP for Lymington) (died 1628), MP for Lymington

See also
Richard Blunt (disambiguation), same pronunciation